The Fresh Fruit Festival was founded as a summer arts festival presented by All Out Arts, and featuring the work of LGBTQ artists as the primary expression of the All Out Arts mission of "Fighting prejudice and homophobia through the arts."  It has since expanded to year-round programming at partner organizations in support of the same goals. As of 2017, it was held at the Wild Project theatre.

History
The Festival was founded by Carol Polcovar in 2002 as a merger of New Village Playwrights and New Village Productions reacted to a current reluctance on the part of major venues to present a truly representative array of LGBT arts. Originally sponsored by All Out Arts, it became a fully owned d/b/a of All Out Arts. The Festival included a wide range of plays, visual arts, dance, and film presentations. Along with the Hot! Festival, it is among the most prominent LGBT-themed festivals in the New York artistic community. Carol Polcovar served as Founding Artistic Director of the festival for its first decade, and upon retirement in 2013 accepted an "Outstanding Achievement" Award for the Fresh Fruit Festival's mission from the Manhattan Borough President's Office.

Ancillary programs

The Festival presented the first of several "OUTmusic" programs in New York City, consisting entirely of vocalists, musicians, and composers who were Lesbian, Gay, Bi, or Transgender. When Michael Biello & Dan Martin created Outmusic Inc. in 1990, All Out Arts served as their fiscal conduit and aided their becoming a unique organization. Outmusic is now a national foundation, sponsoring National Outmusic Awards since 2001.

In 2006 the Festival presented the first event solely dedicated to and entirely by LGBT Native Americans. Native American elder Kent Lebsock presided over the opening convocation, and the event included members of the Cherokee, Mohawk, Chikasaw, Navajo, Creek, Lakota, Kumeyaay and Cree tribes.

See also
 LGBT culture in New York City

References

External links 
The Fresh Fruit Festival Website

Theatre festivals in the United States
Summer festivals
Festivals in New York City
Recurring events established in 2003
Arts festivals in the United States
LGBT arts organizations
LGBT events in the United States